The 2001 WNBA season was the 5th season for the Utah Starzz. The Starzz entered the WNBA Playoffs for the first time in franchise history, where they lost in the first round to the Sacramento Monarchs.

Offseason

WNBA Draft

Regular season

Season standings

Season schedule

Playoffs

Player stats

References

Utah Starzz seasons
Utah
Utah Starzz